There are several think tanks in operation in Greece, commonly known as policy institutes, research organisations, or simply institutes. Some of the think tanks in Greece:

 Hellenic Foundation for European and Foreign Policy (ELIAMEP)
 International Centre for Black Sea Studies (ICBSS)
 Centre of Planning and Economic Research (KEPE)
The Catalyst

References 

Think tanks
Think tanks based in Greece
Greece